Marmorofusus brianoi is a species of sea snail, a marine gastropod mollusc in the family Fasciolariidae, the spindle snails, the tulip snails and their allies.

Description
The length of the shell attains 123.6 mm.

Distribution
This marine species occurs off Madagascar.

References

 Bozzetti L. (2006) A new species of Fusinus (Mollusca: Neogastropoda: Fasciolariidae) from Southern Madagascar. Visaya 1(6): 51-53.

External links
 Lyons W.G. & Snyder M.A. (2019). Reassignments to the genus Marmorofusus Snyder & Lyons, 2014 (Neogastropoda: Fasciolariidae: Fusininae) of species from the Red Sea, Indian Ocean, and southwestern Australia. Zootaxa. 4714(1): 1-64

brianoi
Gastropods described in 2006